Javier González Panton (born ) is a Cuban male volleyball player. He was part of the Cuba men's national volleyball team at the 2002 FIVB Volleyball Men's World Championship in Argentina. He played for ASUL Lyon, CVB52 Chaumont. His actual club is the MVUC Montpellier in France.

Clubs
 ASUL Lyon (2014-2016)
 CVB52HM  CHaumont(2016-2018)
 MVUC Montpellier (2018-)

References

1983 births
Living people
Cuban men's volleyball players
Place of birth missing (living people)
21st-century Cuban people